CAN/ULC S801: Standard on Electric Utility Workplace Electrical Safety for Generation, Transmission and Distribution

This National Standard of Canada applies to the construction, operation, maintenance and replacement of electric utility systems that are used to generate, transform, transmit, distribute and deliver electrical power or energy to consumer services or their equivalent.

Purpose

Live Working (high voltage) may present potential safety risks to workers and the general public. CAN/ULC-S801 gives electric utilities a foundation for safe working environments for their employees across Canada. CAN/ULC-S801 provides a complete safety guide addressing numerous electric utility workplace safety concerns, such as:

 	Fundamental requirements
	Minimum approach distances for working near or on energized electrical lines or equipment
	Protective tools, equipment & devices
	Working on energized electrical lines and equipment
	Arc flash protection
	Radio frequency hazards
	Working on isolated electric utility systems
	Working near electric utility systems

See also

 Electric Utility
 High-voltage hazards
 Arc Flash
 Lockout-Tagout
 Canadian Electrical Code
 Protective clothing

Electrical safety
Construction industry of Canada
Electrical standards
Standards of Canada